William Betts may refer to:
 William Betts (chaplain) (died 1535), supporter of Anne Boleyn
 William Betts (umpire) (1865–1936), baseball umpire
 William Betts (MP) (died 1738), Member of Parliament for Weymouth and Melcombe Regis, 1710, 1713 and 1715–1730
 William Vallance Betts (1862–1933), English architect
 William Betts (1790–1867), English contractor's agent and railway contractor, father of Edward Betts
 Billy Betts (1864–1941), English football player